Far Far Away  may refer to:

Songs
 "Far Far Away" (song), by Slade, 1974
 "Far Far Away", by Battle Beast from Unholy Savior, 2015
 "Far Far Away", by Blackmore's Night from Secret Voyage, 2008
 "Far, Far Away", by Five Iron Frenzy from Five Iron Frenzy 2: Electric Boogaloo''' 2001
 "Far, Far Away", by Wilco from Being There, 1996
 "Far-Far-Away", composed by Ned Rorem, 1963

Other uses
 Far Far Away, a fictional place in the Shrek franchise
 Far Far Away, a Shrek-inspired zone at Universal Studios Singapore
 Far Far Away, a 2013 novel by Tom McNeal
 Classic Star Wars: A Long Time Ago... Volume 7: Far, Far Away, a Star Wars comic book omnibus volume
 Far Far Away (film), a 2021 Hong Kong film

See also
 "Far Far Far Away", a song by Lisa Mitchell from Welcome to the Afternoon''
 Far Away (disambiguation)